The Emperor's New Clothes (Carevo novo ruho) is a 1961 Croatian film directed by Ante Babaja. It is based on Hans Christian Andersen's tale of the same name.

References

External links
 

1961 films
Croatian fantasy comedy films
1960s Croatian-language films
Yugoslav fantasy films
Films directed by Ante Babaja
Films based on works by Hans Christian Andersen
1961 directorial debut films
Works based on The Emperor's New Clothes
Films based on fairy tales
Yugoslav comedy films